Mammoet (Dutch for Mammoth) is a privately held Dutch company specializing in engineered heavy lifting and transport of large objects.

History 

Mammoet’s history started on 13 May 1807 in the Netherlands, when Dutch entrepreneur Jan Goedkoop founded a maritime company with the purchase of a 140-ton cargo vessel. The company, called 'Gebroeders Goedkoop' (‘Goedkoop Brothers’), offered both cargo and passenger transport on water. In 1862 the company acquired its first tugboat, and from 1920 onwards, the company focused on tug and salvage services.

In 1971 Goedkoop merged with Van Wezel from Hengelo, a company that specialized in heavy transport and cranes. The new company was called Mammoet Transport. In 1972 another company was acquired, Stoof Breda, which at that time was one of the Dutch market leaders in engineered heavy lifting and transport.

In 1973 Mammoet Transport became a subsidiary of Koninklijke Nederlandse Stoomboot-Maatschappij (KNSM) in Amsterdam. At the same time, the company name was changed to Mammoet. In 1973 Mammoet Shipping was founded.

In 1981 KNSM and Mammoet became part of Nedlloyd Group. In 2000 Mammoet was acquired by and merged with Van Seumeren Kraanbedrijf, a company that had been founded in 1966.

In 2020, Mammoet merged with UK-based engineered heavy lifting company ALE, forming the largest engineered heavy lifting and transport company in the world.

The company is active in the petrochemical industry, mining and metals, civil construction and the energy sector such as nuclear power, conventional, offshore wind and onshore wind. Globally, approximately 7,000 people work for the company, in about 90 offices and branches. The head office of the holding company is located in Utrecht. The European headquarters is located in Schiedam. Mammoet has offices in North America, South America, the Middle East, Africa and Asia.

Executive Board of Management

The following persons have been active on Mammoet's Executive Board of Management:

 Paul van Gelder (1969), Chief Executive Officer
 Jan Kleijn (1968), Chief Operational Officer
 Tim Tieleman (1980), Chief Financial Officer
 Sylvia Houwers (1972), Chief Human Resources Officer

Use of 'Mammoet' and logo by other companies
Two (former) units of Mammoet use a similar logo:

 Mammoet Road Cargo, heavy and special road transport. Now only 10% owned by Mammoet.
 Mammoet Ferry Transport, transport company between the UK and continental Europe. Now an independent company.

Equipment 

 Cranes
 Jacking System
 Lifting System
 Skidding System
 Ballast Tractors
 Hydraulic modular trailer
 Self-propelled modular trailers
 Weighing System

See also
 Kursk submarine disaster
 Ring cranes
 SPMT
 Heavy hauler
 Ballast Tractor
 Hydraulic modular trailer

References

Marine salvors
Multinational companies headquartered in the Netherlands
Transport companies of the Netherlands
Companies based in South Holland
Schiedam
Heavy haulage